Hatun Hirka (Quechua hatun big, hirka mountain, "big mountain", also spelled Jatun Jirca) is a  mountain in the Andes of Peru. It is located in the Huánuco Region, Huacaybamba Province, Cochabamba District.

References

Mountains of Peru
Mountains of Huánuco Region